Julie Lythcott-Haims is an American educator, author, and politician. She has written three non-fiction books: How to Raise an Adult, on parenting; Real American, a memoir; and Your Turn: How to Be an Adult. She served as dean of freshmen and undergraduate advising at Stanford University. She is a member of the Palo Alto city council.

Early life

Lythcott-Haims was born in Nigeria in 1967 and moved with her parents to the United States in 1969. Her father, George Ignatius Lythcott, was a pediatrician, a professor at Columbia University, the Edward Jenner Professor of Public Health at UW Madison and served as Assistant Surgeon General under President Jimmy Carter.  Her mother, Jean Snookes, is a retired teacher and professor of education at Columbia University Teachers College.

Lythcott-Haims grew up in small towns in New York, Wisconsin, and Virginia.
She earned her B.A. degree from Stanford University. She also earned a Juris Doctor degree from Harvard Law School, and a Master of Fine Arts (M.F.A.) in writing from California College of the Arts.

Career

Lythcott-Haims is the former dean of freshmen and undergraduate advising, and former associate vice provost for undergraduate education at Stanford University. She served in those and other positions with the university for 14 years until leaving in 2012 to pursue an MFA degree. While at Stanford, she was the 2010 winner of the Dinkelspiel Award for contributions to undergraduate education.

Lythcott-Haims' 2015 book, How to Raise an Adult, was a New York Times best-seller on the education list. The book cautions parents against micromanaging, or helicopter parenting their children. It argues that this parenting style prevents them from developing independence and resilience as adults and can negatively impact their mental health.
 A review in the Chicago Tribune said: "Her deep compassion for the young people enduring the endemic stress of [the college admissions] process shines through and her advice about broadening the mindset of applicants — and parents — is solid. But this is the weakest part of a strong book, with the author at times relying more on opinion than fact when it comes to the specifics of college admission, such as testing. Lythcott-Haims' advice is most valuable when it gets down to the brass tacks of how to cultivate a parenting style that produces a resilient, resourceful grownup."

Her 2017 memoir, Real American, describes coming to terms with her racial identity. Her father was a prominent African American physician, her mother white and British, and she was the only non-white student in her high school graduating class. The New York Times review said: “Her feelings metamorphose into palpable anger and resentment as she reaches adulthood, and she finally begins to grasp the perversity of a system that tries to undermine Black Americans from the moment they arrive in the world.” The reviewer said Real American takes the reader on a journey from the author’s initial feelings of self-loathing because of her racial makeup to a sense of self-worth. “By allowing us to witness a woman coming to terms with herself, and finding nothing but pride and love there, she offers a blueprint for how others might try to do the same.” Real American won the 2018 PEN Oakland Josephine Miles Literary Award.

Lythcott-Haims' 2021 book, Your Turn: How to Be an Adult, presents her insights and strategies on living a successful adult life for young people entering adulthood. It discusses adult relationships, maintaining physical and mental health, managing money, and other adult responsibilities.

In November of 2022, Lythcott-Haims was elected to the Palo Alto city council.

Personal life
Lythcott-Haims has two adult children and is married to Dan Lythcott-Haims. She lives in Palo Alto, California. 
In 2008, Lythcott-Haims was chosen as a delegate to the Democratic National Convention from California’s Congressional District 14 for then senator Barack Obama.

Bibliography

References

American women writers
Stanford University alumni
California College of the Arts alumni
Stanford University staff
Harvard Law School alumni
1967 births
Living people
21st-century American women